The following lists events that happened in 1996 in Libya.

Incumbents
 President: Muammar al-Gaddafi
 Prime Minister: Abdul Majid al-Qa′ud

Events
 1995–96 Libyan Premier League
 1996–97 Libyan Premier League

 
Years of the 20th century in Libya
Libya
Libya
1990s in Libya